Alejandro Julio Mercado Aguilar (born September 4, 1983) is a Mexican football manager and former player.

References

Living people
1983 births
Association football defenders
Club León footballers
Querétaro F.C. footballers
Atlante F.C. footballers
Tecos F.C. footballers
Correcaminos UAT footballers
Lobos BUAP footballers
Toros Neza footballers
Dorados de Sinaloa footballers
Club Necaxa footballers
Alebrijes de Oaxaca players
Irapuato F.C. footballers
Liga MX players
Ascenso MX players
Mexican football managers
Footballers from Morelos
Sportspeople from Cuernavaca
Mexican footballers